Ropoča is a village in the Municipality of Rogašovci in the Prekmurje region of northeastern Slovenia. The Ledava River flows into a reservoir just south of the main settlement.

There is a round chapel in the centre of the village dedicated to the Sacred Heart of Jesus. It belongs to the Parish of Pertoča. It was built in the early 20th century.

References

External links

Ropoča on Geopedia

Populated places in the Municipality of Rogašovci